Norrköpings BTK was a table tennis club in Norrköping, Sweden. The club won the Swedish national women's team championship during the season of 1997–1998.

References

Sport in Norrköping
Table tennis clubs in Sweden